Mohamed Missouri (7 December 1947 – 29 June 2015) was an Algerian amateur boxer and coach.

Early life
Missouri was born in 1947 in the village of Merchicha within the Col des Beni Aïcha region, in the east of the Khachna Massif and in the south of the town of Thénia before the Algerian independence.

He lived his young age in the mountainous and wooded region near the course of Oued Meraldene and its Meraldene Dam, and not far from the Zawiyet Sidi Boushaki in the aftermath of the World War II and in the period preceding the outbreak of the Algerian Revolution.

He completed his primary studies in the midst of the independence war in the boys' school in Thénia (former Ménerville), which was renamed Mohamed Farhi school after 1962.

Career

Missouri enlisted in his youth in the military body of the Gendarmerie Nationale, then distinguished himself in boxing and military sports.

Missouri perfected in the discipline of boxing in the USM El Harrach team with trainer Abdelkader Kossaïri, then opted for the CR Belouizdad team where he was supported by trainer Brahim Bouafia, former boxing champion and national trainer, who welcomed him with open arms.

Bouafia passed on his knowledge to his foal Missouri from 1969 and introduced him to focusing well in boxing which is a wonderful sport that can become dangerous if it is not practiced with all the seriousness required.

After his selection as a professional boxer, Missouri was thus framed in his future exploits by Bouafia who was then assisted by his two assistants, the Polish Granichec and the Algerian Akli Kebbab.

Bouafia managed the young boxer Missouri well during the national interligue tournament in Oran in July 1969 which was held in the Nedjma cinema, and this allowed him to win the heavyweight title.

During the various national boxing competitions in which he participated, Missouri won the title of champion of Algeria 9 times.

He was Maghrebian champion in 1973 in Agadir, then Arab champion in 1976 in Damascus, and then gold medalist at the Mediterranean Games of Algiers in 1975, at the Hacène Harcha Arena, after his victory in the final against the Egyptian Khalil Ali Khalti.

Indeed, it was then the trainer Kouider Ayad who supervised Missouri in the national A boxing team in 1975 when he participated in the Mediterranean Games and that he collected with his colleagues Hocine Nini and Siad the count of seven medals including two in gold.

During the decade of 1969 and 1979, he played 154 national and international fights, winning 139, losing 13 and drawing twice.

Coach

After retiring from the military, Missouri took internships to earn his boxing coaching degrees to teach this noble art to younger generations.

He created a boxing school for gendarmes and sailors, he launched a new professional dynamic for the training and maintenance of the physical fitness of Algerian military personnel.

By converting to coaching for a period of 25 years, he notably led the boxing team of the Gendarmerie Nationale and that of the Algerian National Navy.

Missouri's efforts were seeking to contribute to building a modern sport and a brilliant elite capable of honoring national colors in international forums and responding to the tremendous sacrifices made by the Algerian people in order to emancipate from the yoke of French colonialism.

He also holds two diplomas, one as a teacher of physical education and sports, and the other as a professional boxing trainer of class III.

He also led the National Military Boxing Team which competed in the 1995 Military World Games organized in Rome, Italy.

Awards

Missouri won several fights in national and international championships and then received trophies and medals, including:
  medal at the 1978 All-Africa Games in Algiers, Algeria (middleweight)
  medal at the 1975 Mediterranean Games in Algiers, Algeria (middleweight)
  medal at the 1976 Pan Arab Games in Damascus, Syria (middleweight)
  medal at the 1973 All-Africa Games in Lagos, Nigeria (middleweight)
  medal at the 1973 Maghreb Athletics Championships in Agadir, Morocco (middleweight)
  medal at the Algerian championships 9 times in Algiers, Algeria (middleweight)

Books

Missouri has written several books during a long sporting career, including:
 (2004) Boxing Through the Ages.
 (2009) Boxing giants: Professionalism in the Twentieth Century.
 (2014) Boxing is an art of nobility.
 Boxing is life and exercise.
 How to practice the art of boxing.

Disciples
Missouri has coached several boxers who have won medals and awards in international games on the National Military Team, including:
 Mohamed Allalou (born 1973)

Death
Monday, 29 June 2015 Missouri died at the age of 68, following a long illness.

He had been hospitalized at the Aïn Naâdja military hospital in the Algiers Province.

He was buried on Tuesday, 30 June 2015 after the Zuhr prayer in the Sidi Garidi Cemetery within the commune of Kouba in Algiers, in the presence of a large crowd of his family and friends.

See also

External links

Bibliography

References

1947 births
Algerian people
People from Thénia
People from Thénia District
People from Boumerdès Province
Kabyle people
2015 deaths
Deaths in Algeria
Algerian military personnel
Military of Algeria
Algerian sportspeople
Algerian sports coaches
Algerian male boxers
Middleweight boxers
Competitors at the 1973 All-Africa Games
Boxers at the 1973 All-Africa Games
African Games bronze medalists for Algeria
Competitors at the 1975 Mediterranean Games
Mediterranean Games gold medalists for Algeria
Mediterranean Games medalists in boxing
African Games medalists in boxing
21st-century Algerian people